Colomychus talis, the distinguished colymychus moth, is a moth in the family Crambidae. It was described by Augustus Radcliffe Grote in 1878. It is found in Mexico and the south-eastern United States, where it has been recorded from Alabama, Arkansas, Florida, Georgia, Maryland, North Carolina, Oklahoma, South Carolina and Virginia.

Adults are on wing from May to August.

References

Moths described in 1878
Spilomelinae